Ywathit is a village in Kyain Seikgyi Township, Kawkareik District, in the Kayin State of Myanmar. It is located on the eastern bank of the Winyaw River.

References

External links
 "Ywathit Map — Satellite Images of Ywathit" Maplandia World Gazetteer
 

 
Populated places in Kayin State